The Cooperative Democratic Party (Kyōdō Minshutō) was a political party in Japan.

History
The party was established as the Cooperative Democratic Club on 24 May 1946 as a merger of the Japan Cooperative Party and several minor local parties with links to farmers or small businesses, and initially had 31 Diet members. Twelve days after its establishment, it was renamed the Cooperative Democratic Party (CDP).

Later in the year the party held talks with the Shinseikai about a merger, but a sticking point was the inclusion of the word "cooperative" in the new party's name, which the Shinseikai members were against. The dispute also led to two CDP members leaving the party due to their refusal to compromise. In March 1947, following the passing of a new electoral law that favoured larger parties, the CDP merged with the National Party to form the National Cooperative Party.

References

Further reading

Cooperative parties
Defunct political parties in Japan
Political parties established in 1946
1946 establishments in Japan
Political parties disestablished in 1947
1947 disestablishments in Japan